John Bell House in Lexington, Kentucky, also known as Stonehigh or John Webb House was built in c. 1810 by John Bell.  It was listed on the National Register of Historic Places in 1983.

It is a two-story stone house built c.1810 with a one-story stone ell built at the same time.  It also has a one-story brick ell built c.1840 to serve as a kitchen.  In 1982 was in excellent condition.  It was then in a picturesque rural setting but is now within Lexington.

The property includes a brick smokehouse, a two-story spring house and granary, and more.

References

National Register of Historic Places in Lexington, Kentucky
Federal architecture in Kentucky
Houses completed in 1810
Houses in Lexington, Kentucky
Houses on the National Register of Historic Places in Kentucky
1810 establishments in Kentucky